Museums10 is a consortium of art, science, and history museums in Western Massachusetts.  It includes art museums from the Five Colleges and Historic Deerfield.

Art museums
 The Hampshire College Art Gallery (Hampshire College)
 The Mead Art Museum (Amherst College)
 The Mount Holyoke College Art Museum (Mount Holyoke College)
 The Smith College Museum of Art (Smith College)
 The University Museum of Contemporary Art (University of Massachusetts Amherst)

Other museums
 The Beneski Museum of Natural History
 The Emily Dickinson Museum
 The Eric Carle Museum of Picture Book Art
 Historic Deerfield
 The Yiddish Book Center

See also
 Five College Museums/Historic Deerfield: Another set of museums, recorder of the works in the college art museums and Historic Deerfield.

References

External links
 Official website

Amherst College
Art in Massachusetts
Hampshire College
Mount Holyoke College
Museum organizations
Smith College
University of Massachusetts Amherst